Nyctemera genora is a moth of the family Erebidae first described by Charles Swinhoe in 1917. It is found on New Guinea.

References

Nyctemerina
Moths described in 1917